Paul Marioni (b. 1941 Cincinnati, Ohio)  is an American artist who works in the medium of glass.

Biography 
Marioni graduated from the University of Cincinnati in 1967 with a degree in philosophy. He became a filmmaker, then started working with glass when he became interested in light, reflection, refraction, and expression. One of the founders of the studio-glass movement, Marioni is a Fellow of the American Craft Council and has received three fellowships from the National Endowment of the Arts. He has taught at Penland School of Crafts and Pilchuck Glass School (1974-1988).

He has two children, Marina and Dante, both of whom are artists. Marina is a jewelry maker and Dante is a glassblower. In 1998, Marioni and his son presented a feature exhibition of their glass at the Fresno Art Museum in California.

About his work 

Marioni's work is held by several museums, including the Museum of Arts & Design, The Corning Museum of Glass, the Museum of Glass, and the Smithsonian American Art Museum.

His work is about human nature and is often inspired by his dreams. Known as an innovator in the glass world, Marioni pushes his techniques to their limits, regularly redefining what is possible to achieve with the medium. “I work with glass for its distinct ability to capture and manipulate light. While my techniques are often inventive, they are only in service of the image,” says Paul.

References

External links 
 Craft in America 2007
 Smithsonian Archives of American Art, Oral history interview with Paul Marioni, 2006 Sept.18-19
 Paul Marioni: Artist, a documentary about his career by John Forsen
 Biography: Paul Marioni, Corning Museum of Glass

1941 births
Living people
American artists